

Events

Pre-1600
 502 – Chinese emperor Xiao Yan names Xiao Tong his heir designate.
 640 – Pope John IV is elected, several months after his predecessor's death.
 759 – Tang dynasty poet Du Fu departs for Chengdu, where he is hosted by fellow poet Pei Di.
1144 – The capital of the crusader County of Edessa falls to Imad ad-Din Zengi, the atabeg of Mosul and Aleppo.
1294 – Pope Boniface VIII is elected, replacing St. Celestine V, who had resigned.
1500 – A joint Venetian–Spanish fleet captures the Castle of St. George on the island of Cephalonia.

1601–1900
1737 – The Marathas defeat the combined forces of the Mughal Empire, Rajputs of Jaipur, Nizam of Hyderabad, Nawab of Awadh and Nawab of Bengal in the Battle of Bhopal.
1777 – Kiritimati, also called Christmas Island, is discovered by James Cook.
1800 – The Plot of the rue Saint-Nicaise fails to kill Napoleon Bonaparte.
1814 – Representatives of the United Kingdom and the United States sign the Treaty of Ghent, ending the War of 1812.
1818 – The first performance of "Silent Night" takes place in the church of St. Nikolaus in Oberndorf, Austria.
1826 – The Eggnog Riot at the United States Military Academy begins that night, wrapping up the following morning.
1846 – British acquired Labuan from the Sultanate of Brunei for Great Britain.
1865 – Jonathan Shank and Barry Ownby form The Ku Klux Klan.
1868 – The Greek Presidential Guard is established as the royal escort by King George I.
1871 – The opera Aida premieres in Cairo, Egypt.

1901–present
1906 – Reginald Fessenden transmits the first radio broadcast; consisting of a poetry reading, a violin solo, and a speech.
1913 – The Italian Hall disaster in Calumet, Michigan results in the deaths of 73 striking workers families at a Christmas party participants (including 59 children) when someone falsely yells "fire".
1914 – World War I: The "Christmas truce" begins.
1918 – Region of Međimurje is captured by the Kingdom of Serbs, Croats and Slovenes from Hungary.
1920 – Gabriele D'Annunzio surrendered the Italian Regency of Carnaro in the city of Fiume to Italian Armed Forces.
1924 – Albania becomes a republic.
1929 – Assassination attempt on Argentine President Hipólito Yrigoyen.
  1929   – A four alarm fire breaks out in the West Wing of the White House in Washington, D.C.
1939 – World War II: Pope Pius XII makes a Christmas Eve appeal for peace.
1941 – World War II: Kuching is conquered by Japanese forces.
  1941   – World War II: Benghazi is conquered by the British Eighth Army.
1942 – World War II: French monarchist, Fernand Bonnier de La Chapelle, assassinates Vichy French Admiral François Darlan in Algiers, Algeria.
1943 – World War II: U.S. General Dwight D. Eisenhower is named Supreme Allied Commander for the Operation Overlord.
1944 – World War II: The Belgian Troopship Leopoldville was torpedoed and sank with the loss of 763 soldiers and 56 crew.
1945 – Five of nine children become missing after their home in Fayetteville, West Virginia, is burned down.
1951 – Libya becomes independent. Idris I is proclaimed King of Libya.
1952 – First flight of Britain's Handley Page Victor strategic bomber.
1953 – Tangiwai disaster: In New Zealand's North Island, at Tangiwai, a railway bridge is damaged by a lahar and collapses beneath a passenger train, killing 151 people.
1964 – Vietnam War: Viet Cong operatives bomb the Brinks Hotel in Saigon, South Vietnam to demonstrate they can strike an American installation in the heavily guarded capital.
  1964   – Flying Tiger Line Flight 282 crashes after takeoff from San Francisco International Airport, killing three.
1966 – A Canadair CL-44 chartered by the United States military crashes into a small village in South Vietnam, killing 111.
1968 – Apollo program: The crew of Apollo 8 enters into orbit around the Moon, becoming the first humans to do so. They performed ten lunar orbits and broadcast live TV pictures.
1969 – Nigerian troops capture Umuahia, the Biafran capital.
1971 – LANSA Flight 508 is struck by lightning and crashes in the Puerto Inca District in the Department of Huánuco in Peru, killing 91.
1973 – District of Columbia Home Rule Act is passed, allowing residents of Washington, D.C. to elect their own local government.
1974 – Cyclone Tracy devastates Darwin, Australia.
1994 – Air France Flight 8969 is hijacked on the ground at Houari Boumediene Airport, Algiers, Algeria. Over the course of three days three passengers are killed, as are all four terrorists.
1996 – A Learjet 35 crashes into Smarts Mountain near Dorchester, New Hampshire, killing both pilots on board.
1997 – The Sid El-Antri massacre in Algeria kills between 50 and 100 people.
1999 – Indian Airlines Flight 814 is hijacked in Indian airspace between Kathmandu, Nepal, and Delhi, India. The aircraft landed at Kandahar in Afghanistan. The incident ended on December 31 with the release of 190 survivors (one passenger is killed).
2003 – The Spanish police thwart an attempt by ETA to detonate 50 kg of explosives at 3:55 p.m. inside Madrid's busy Chamartín Station.
2005 – Chad–Sudan relations: Chad declares a state of belligerence against Sudan following a December 18 attack on Adré, which left about 100 people dead.
2008 – The Lord's Resistance Army, a Ugandan rebel group, begins a series of attacks against civilians in the Democratic Republic of the Congo, massacring more than 400.
2018 – A helicopter crash kills Martha Érika Alonso, first female Governor of Puebla, Mexico, and her husband Rafael Moreno Valle Rosas, former governor.
2021 – Burmese military forces commit the Mo So massacre, killing at least 44 civilians

Births

Pre-1600
3 BC – Galba, Roman emperor (d. 69)
1166 – John, King of England (d. 1216)
1389 – John V, Duke of Brittany (d. 1442)
1474 – Bartolomeo degli Organi, Italian musician (d. 1539)
1475 – Thomas Murner, German poet and translator (d. 1537)
1508 – Pietro Carnesecchi, Italian scholar (d. 1567)
1520 – Martha Leijonhufvud, Swedish noble (d. 1584)
1537 – Willem IV van den Bergh, Stadtholder of Guelders and Zutphen (d. 1586)
1549 – Kaspar Ulenberg, German theologian (d. 1617)
1588 – Constance of Austria (d. 1631)
1596 – Leonaert Bramer, Dutch painter (d. 1674)
1597 – Honoré II, Prince of Monaco (d. 1662)

1601–1900
1625 – Johann Rudolph Ahle, German organist, composer, and theorist (d. 1673)
1635 – Mariana of Austria (d. 1696)
1679 – Domenico Sarro, Italian composer and educator (d. 1744)
1698 – William Warburton, English bishop (d. 1779)
1726 – Johann Hartmann, Danish composer (d. 1793)
1731 – Julie Bondeli,  Swiss salonist and lady of letters (d. 1778)
1754 – George Crabbe, English priest, surgeon, and poet (d. 1832)
1761 – Selim III, Ottoman sultan (d. 1808)
  1761   – Jean-Louis Pons, French astronomer (d. 1831)
1797 – Carl Georg von Wächter, German jurist (d. 1880)
1798 – Adam Mickiewicz, Polish poet and playwright (d. 1855)
1809 – Kit Carson, American general (d. 1868)
1810 – Wilhelm Marstrand, Danish painter and illustrator (d. 1873)
1812 – Karl Eduard Zachariae von Lingenthal, German lawyer and jurist (d. 1894)
1818 – James Prescott Joule, English physicist and brewer (d. 1889)
1822 – Matthew Arnold, English poet and critic (d. 1888)
1827 – Alexander von Oettingen, German theologian and statistician (d. 1905)
1837 – Empress Elisabeth of Austria (d. 1898)
1843 – Lydia Koidula, Estonian poet and playwright (d. 1886)
1845 – George I of Greece (d. 1913)
1865 – Szymon Askenazy, Polish historian, educator, and diplomat, founded the Askenazy school (d. 1935)
1867 – Tevfik Fikret, Turkish poet and educator (d. 1915)
1868 – Charles Harvey Bollman, American naturalist (d. 1889)
  1868   – Emanuel Lasker, German chess player, mathematician, and philosopher (d. 1941)
1869 – Henriette Roland Holst, Dutch poet, playwright, and politician (d. 1952)
1872 – Frederick Semple, American golfer and tennis player (d. 1927)
1875 – Émile Wegelin, French rower (d. 1962)
1877 – Sigrid Schauman, Finnish painter and critic (d. 1979)
1879 – Émile Nelligan, Canadian poet (d. 1941)
  1879   – Alexandrine of Mecklenburg-Schwerin (d. 1952)
1880 – Johnny Gruelle, American author and illustrator (d. 1939)
1881 – Charles Wakefield Cadman, American composer and critic (d. 1946)
1882 – Hans Rebane, Estonian journalist and politician, 8th Estonian Minister of Foreign Affairs (d. 1961)
  1882   – Georges Legagneux, French aviator (d. 1914) 
1883 – Stefan Jaracz, Polish actor and producer (d. 1945) 
1885 – Paul Manship, American sculptor (d. 1966)
1886 – Michael Curtiz, Hungarian-American actor, director, and producer (d. 1962)
1887 – Louis Jouvet, French actor and producer (d. 1951)
1891 – Feodor Stepanovich Rojankovsky, Russian illustrator and painter (d. 1970)
1892 – Ruth Chatterton, American actress (d. 1961)
  1893   – Harry Warren, American pianist and composer (d. 1981)
1894 – Georges Guynemer, French captain and pilot (d. 1917)
  1894   – Jack Thayer, American businessman (d. 1945)
1895 – E. Roland Harriman, American financier and philanthropist (d. 1978)
  1895   – Noel Streatfeild, English author (d. 1986)
  1895   – Marguerite Williams, American geologist (d. 1991)
1897 – Ville Pörhölä, Finnish shot putter and discus thrower (d. 1964)
  1897   – Väinö Sipilä, Finnish runner (d. 1987)
1898 – Baby Dodds, American drummer (d. 1959)
1900 – Joey Smallwood, Canadian journalist and politician, 1st Premier of Newfoundland (d. 1991)
  1900   – Hawayo Takata, Japanese-American teacher and master practitioner of Reiki (d. 1980)

1901–present
1903 – Joseph Cornell, American sculptor and director (d. 1972)
  1903   – Ernst Krenkel, Polish-Russian geographer and explorer (d. 1971)
  1903   – Ava Helen Pauling, American humanitarian and activist (d. 1981)
1904 – Joseph M. Juran, Romanian-American engineer and businessman (d. 2008)
1905 – Howard Hughes, American businessman, engineer, and pilot (d. 1976)
1906 – Franz Waxman, German-American composer and conductor (d. 1967)
1907 – I. F. Stone, American journalist and author (d. 1989)
1910 – Ellen Braumüller, German javelin thrower and triathlete (d. 1991)
  1910   – Fritz Leiber, American author and poet (d. 1992)
  1910   – Max Miedinger, Swiss typeface designer, created Helvetica (d. 1980)
1913 – Ad Reinhardt, American painter and academic (d. 1967)
1914 – Ralph Marterie, Italian-American trumpet player and bandleader (d. 1978)
  1914   – Herbert Reinecker, German author and screenwriter (d. 2007)
1918 – Dave Bartholomew, American bandleader, composer and arranger (d. 2019)
1919 – Qateel Shifai, Pakistani poet and songwriter (d. 2001)
  1919   – Pierre Soulages, French artist (d. 2022)
1920 – Franco Lucentini, Italian author and screenwriter (d. 2002)
  1920   – Yevgeniya Rudneva, Ukrainian-Russian lieutenant and navigator (d. 1944)
1921 – Bill Dudley, American football player (d. 2010)
1922 – Ava Gardner, American actress (d. 1990)
1923 – George Patton IV, American general (d. 2004)
  1923   – William C. Schneider, American aerospace engineer (d. 1999)
1924 – Lee Dorsey, American singer-songwriter (d. 1986)
  1924   – Abdirizak Haji Hussein, Somalian soldier and politician, 4th Prime Minister of Somalia (d. 2014)
  1924   – Mohammed Rafi, Indian singer (d. 1980)
1927 – Mary Higgins Clark, American author (d. 2020)
1928 – Lev Vlassenko, Georgian-Australian pianist and educator (d. 1996)
  1928   – Norman Rossington, English actor (d. 1999)
1929 – Lennart Skoglund, Swedish footballer (d. 1975)
  1929   – Philip Ziegler, English historian and author
1930 – Robert Joffrey, American dancer and choreographer (d. 1988)
  1930   – John J. Kelley, American runner (d. 2011)
1931 – Ray Bryant, American pianist and composer (d. 2011)
  1931   – Mauricio Kagel, Argentinian-German composer and scholar (d. 2008)
1932 – Colin Cowdrey, Indian-English cricketer (d. 2000)
  1932   – On Kawara, Japanese-American painter (d. 2014)
1934 – John Critchinson, English pianist and composer (d. 2017)
  1934   – Stjepan Mesić, Croatian lawyer and politician, 2nd President of Croatia
  1934   – Alex Hutchinson, Australian jazz musician
1936 – Ivan Lawrence, English lawyer and politician
1937 – Félix Miélli Venerando, Brazilian footballer and manager (d. 2012)
  1937   – John Taylor, Baron Kilclooney, Northern Irish politician, Irish Minister of Home Affairs
1938 – Bobby Henrich, American baseball player
  1938   – Valentim Loureiro, Portuguese soldier and politician
1940 – Janet Carroll, American actress and singer (d. 2012)
  1940   – Anthony Fauci, American physician, Director of National Institute of Allergy and Infectious Diseases
1941 – Mike Hazlewood, English singer-songwriter (d. 2001)
1942 – Indra Bania, Indian actor, director, and playwright (d. 2015)
  1942   – Jonathan Borofsky, American sculptor and painter
  1942   – Đoàn Viết Hoạt, Vietnamese journalist, educator, and activist
1943 – Tarja Halonen, Finnish lawyer and politician, 11th President of Finland
  1943   – Suzy Menkes, English journalist and critic
1944 – Barry Elliott, English actor and screenwriter (d. 2018)
  1944   – Mike Curb, American businessman and politician, 42nd Lieutenant Governor of California
  1944   – Oswald Gracias, Indian cardinal
  1944   – Daniel Johnson, Jr., Canadian lawyer and politician, 25th Premier of Quebec
  1944   – Erhard Keller, German speed skater
  1944   – Bob Shaw, Australian golfer
  1944   – Woody Shaw, American trumpeter (d. 1989)
1945 – Lemmy, English hard rock singer-songwriter and bass player (d. 2015)
  1945   – Steve Smith, Canadian-American actor and comedian
1946 – Jan Akkerman, Dutch rock guitarist and songwriter
  1946   – Jeff Sessions, American lawyer and politician, 44th Attorney General of Alabama and 84th Attorney General of the United States
1947 – Kevin Sheedy, Australian footballer and coach
1948 – Stan Bowles, English footballer and sportscaster
  1948   – Frank Oliver, New Zealand rugby player and coach
1949 – Warwick Brown, Australian race car driver
  1949   – Randy Neugebauer, American accountant and politician
1950 – Dana Gioia, American poet and critic
  1950   – Hiroshi Ikushima, Japanese businessman and academic
  1950   – Libby Larsen, American composer
  1950   – Tommy Turtle, British soldier (d. 2020) 
1951 – John D'Acquisto, American baseball player
  1951   – Nick Kent, English-French journalist and author
1952 – Michael Ray, American jazz musician
1953 – Timothy Carhart, American actor
1954 – Yves Debay, Congolese-French commander and journalist (d. 2013)
  1954   – José María Figueres, Costa Rican businessman and politician, President of Costa Rica
  1954   – Helen Jones, English lawyer and politician
1955 – Scott Fischer, American mountaineer and guide (d. 1996)
  1955   – Clarence Gilyard, American actor and educator (d. 2022)
1956 – Anil Kapoor, Indian actor and producer
  1956   – Shim Hwa-jin, South Korean academic and educator
1957 – Hamid Karzai, Afghan politician, 12th President of Afghanistan
1958 – Munetaka Higuchi, Japanese drummer and producer (d. 2008)
  1958   – Paul Pressey, American basketball player and coach
  1958   – Gene Sperling, American economist 
  1958   – Diane Tell, Canadian singer-songwriter and guitarist
1959 – Chris Blackhurst, English journalist
  1959   – Lee Daniels, American director and producer
1960 – Glenn McQueen, Canadian-American animator (d. 2002)
  1960   – Carol Vorderman, Welsh television host
1961 – Ilham Aliyev, Azerbaijani businessman and politician, 4th President of Azerbaijan
  1961   – Mary Barra, American businesswoman, current CEO and chairwoman of General Motors
  1961   – Eriko Kitagawa, Japanese director and screenwriter
  1961   – Darren Wharton, English singer-songwriter and keyboard player
  1961   – Wade Williams, American actor
  1961   – Jay Wright, American basketball player and coach
1962 – Kate Spade, American fashion designer (d. 2018)
1963 – Caroline Aherne, English actress, producer, and screenwriter (d. 2016)
  1963   – Jay Bilas, American basketball player and sportscaster
  1963   – Timo Jutila, Finnish ice hockey player and sportscaster
  1963   – Mary Ramsey, American singer-songwriter and violinist
  1963   – Neil Turbin, American singer-songwriter 
1964 – Mark Valley, American actor
1965 – Millard Powers, American bass player, songwriter, and producer 
1966 – Diedrich Bader, American actor
1967 – Mikhail Shchennikov, Russian race walker
  1967   – Pernilla Wahlgren, Swedish singer and actress
1968 – Doyle Bramhall II, American singer-songwriter and guitarist 
  1968   – Marleen Renders, Belgian runner
1969 – Brad Anderson, American wrestler
  1969   – Milan Blagojevic, Australian footballer and manager
  1969   – Pernille Fischer Christensen, Danish director and screenwriter
  1969   – Taro Goto, Japanese soccer player
  1969   – Leavander Johnson, American boxer (d. 2005)
  1969   – Ryuji Kato, Japanese soccer player
  1969   – Nick Love, English director and screenwriter
  1969   – Clinton McKinnon, American saxophonist and keyboard player 
  1969   – Ed Miliband, English academic and politician, Minister for the Cabinet Office
  1969   – Mark Millar, Scottish author
  1969   – Luis Musrri, Chilean footballer and manager
  1969   – Oleg Skripochka, Russian astronaut and engineer
  1969   – Gintaras Staučė, Lithuanian footballer and manager
  1969   – Michael Zucchet, American economist and politician
1970 – Adam Haslett, American author and academic
  1970   – Amaury Nolasco, Puerto Rican-American actor
1971 – Geoff Allott, New Zealand cricketer
  1971   – Sascha Fischer, German rugby player
  1971   – Ricky Martin, Puerto Rican-American singer-songwriter and actor 
1972 – Álvaro Mesén, Costa Rican footballer
  1972   – Klaus Schnellenkamp, Chilean businessman and author
1973 – Liu Dong, Chinese-Spanish runner
  1973   – Paul Foot, English comedian
  1973   – Stephenie Meyer, American author and film producer
  1973   – Ali Salem Tamek, Moroccan activist
1974 – Thure Lindhardt, Danish actor
  1974   – Paal Nilssen-Love, Norwegian drummer and composer 
  1974   – Marcelo Salas, Chilean footballer
  1974   – Ryan Seacrest, American radio host and television personality, and producer
  1974   – J.D. Walsh, American actor, director, and producer
1976 – Linda Ferga, French hurdler
1977 – Michael Raymond-James, American actor
1978 – Yıldıray Baştürk, German-Turkish footballer
  1978   – Warren Tredrea, Australian footballer and sportscaster
1979 – Chris Hero, American wrestler and trainer
1980 – Stephen Appiah, Ghanaian footballer
  1980   – Tomas Kalnoky, Czech-American singer-songwriter and guitarist 
  1980   – Maarja Liis-Ilus, Estonian pop musician
1981 – Dima Bilan, Russian singer-songwriter and actor
1984 – Isaac De Gois, Australian rugby league player
1985 – Alexey Dmitriev, German ice hockey player
  1985   – David Ragan, American race car driver
1986 – Tim Elliott, American mixed martial artist
  1986   – Kyrylo Fesenko, Ukrainian basketball player
1987 – Jane Summersett, American ice dancer
1988 – Stefanos Athanasiadis, Greek footballer
  1988   – Emre Özkan, Turkish footballer
  1988   – Simon Zenke, Nigerian footballer
1990 – Brigetta Barrett, American high jumper
  1990   – Marcus Jordan, American basketball player
  1990   – Ryo Miyake, Japanese fencer
1991 – Lara Michel, Swiss tennis player
  1991   – Louis Tomlinson, English singer
1992 – Davante Adams, American football player
1994 – Fa'amanu Brown, New Zealand rugby league player
  1994   – Miguel Castro, Dominican baseball player
  1994   – Matt Frawley, Australian rugby league player
  1994   – Han Seung-woo, South Korean singer
  1994   – Seola, South Korean singer and actress
1995 – Anett Kontaveit, Estonian tennis player

Deaths

Pre-1600
36 – Gongsun Shu, emperor of Chengjia
 427 – Archbishop Sisinnius I of Constantinople
 903 – Hedwiga, duchess of Saxony
 950 – Shi Hongzhao, Chinese general
   950   – Wang Zhang, Chinese official
   950   – Yang Bin, Chinese chancellor
1193 – Roger III of Sicily (b. 1175)
1257 – John I, Count of Hainaut (b. 1218)
1263 – Hōjō Tokiyori, regent of Japan (b. 1227)
1281 – Henry V of Luxembourg (b. 1216)
1449 – Walter Bower, Scottish chronicler (b. 1385)
1453 – John Dunstaple, English composer (b. 1390)
1456 – Đurađ Branković, Despot of Serbia (b. 1377)
1473 – John Cantius, Polish scholar and theologian (b. 1390)
1524 – Vasco da Gama, Portuguese explorer and politician, Governor of Portuguese India (b. 1469)
1541 – Andreas Karlstadt, Christian theologian and reformer (b. 1486)

1601–1900
1635 – Hester Jonas, German nurse (b. 1570)
1660 – Mary, Princess Royal and Princess of Orange (b. 1631)
1707 – Noël Coypel, French painter and educator (b. 1628)
1813 – Empress Go-Sakuramachi of Japan (b. 1740)
1844 – Friedrich Bernhard Westphal, Danish-German painter (b. 1803)
1863 – William Makepeace Thackeray, English author and poet (b. 1811)
1865 – Charles Lock Eastlake, English painter and historian (b. 1793)
1867 – José Mariano Salas, Mexican general and politician. President of Mexico (1846, 1859) and regent of the Second Mexican Empire (b. 1797)
1868 – Adolphe d'Archiac, French paleontologist and geologist (b. 1802)
1872 – William John Macquorn Rankine, Scottish physicist and engineer (b. 1820)
1873 – Johns Hopkins, American businessman and philanthropist (b. 1795)
1879 – Anna Bochkoltz, German operatic soprano, voice teacher and composer (b. 1815)
1889 – Jan Jakob Lodewijk ten Kate, Dutch pastor and poet (b. 1819)
1893 – B. T. Finniss, Australian politician, 1st Premier of South Australia (b. 1807)
1898 – Charbel Makhluf, Lebanese priest and saint (b. 1828)

1901–present
1914 – John Muir, Scottish-American geologist, botanist, and author, founded Sierra Club (b. 1838)
1920 – Stephen Mosher Wood, American lieutenant and politician (b. 1832)
1926 – Wesley Coe, American shot putter, hammer thrower, and discus thrower (b. 1879)
1931 – Carlo Fornasini, micropalaeontologist (b. 1854)
  1931   – Flying Hawk, American warrior, educator and historian (b. 1854)
1935 – Alban Berg, Austrian composer and educator (b. 1885)
1938 – Bruno Taut, German architect and urban planner (b. 1880)
1941 – Siegfried Alkan, German composer (b. 1858)
1942 – François Darlan, French admiral and politician, 122nd Prime Minister of France (b. 1881)
1945 – Josephine Sabel, American singer and comedian (b. 1866)
1947 – Charles Gondouin, French rugby player and tug of war competitor (b. 1875)
1957 – Norma Talmadge, American actress and producer (b. 1894)
1961 – Robert Hillyer, American poet and academic (b. 1895)
1962 – Wilhelm Ackermann, German mathematician (b. 1896)
  1962   – Eveline Adelheid von Maydell, German illustrator (b. 1890)
1964 – Claudia Jones, Trinidad-British journalist and activist (b. 1915)
1965 – John Black, English businessman (b. 1895)
  1965   – William M. Branham, American minister and theologian (b. 1906)
1967 – Burt Baskin, American businessman, co-founded Baskin-Robbins (b. 1913)
1969 – Stanisław Błeszyński, Polish-German entomologist and lepidopterist (b. 1927)
  1969   – Cortelia Clark, American singer-songwriter and guitarist (b. 1907)
  1969   – Olivia FitzRoy, English soldier and author (b. 1921)
  1969   – Alfred B. Skar, Norwegian journalist and politician (b. 1896)
1971 – Maria Koepcke, German-Peruvian ornithologist and zoologist (b. 1924)
1972 – Gisela Richter, English-American archaeologist and historian (b. 1882)
1973 – Fritz Gause, German historian and author (b. 1893)
1975 – Bernard Herrmann, American composer and conductor (b. 1911)
1977 – Samael Aun Weor, Colombian author and educator (b. 1917)
1980 – Karl Dönitz, German admiral and politician, President of Germany (b. 1891)
1982 – Louis Aragon, French author and poet (b. 1897)
1984 – Peter Lawford, English-American actor (b. 1923)
1985 – Robert Todd Lincoln Beckwith, American lawyer (b. 1904)
  1985   – Camille Tourville, Canadian-American wrestler and manager (b. 1927)
1986 – Gardner Fox, American author (b. 1911)
1987 – Joop den Uyl, Dutch journalist, economist, and politician, 45th Prime Minister of the Netherlands (b. 1919)
  1987   – M. G. Ramachandran, Sri Lankan-Indian actor, producer, and politician, 5th Chief Minister of Tamil Nadu (b. 1917)
1988 – Jainendra Kumar, Indian author (b. 1905)
1990 – Thorbjørn Egner, Norwegian playwright and songwriter (b. 1922)
1991 – Virginia Sorensen, American author (b. 1912)
1992 – Bobby LaKind, American singer-songwriter and conga player (b. 1945)
  1992   – James Mathews, Australian rugby league player (b. 1968)
  1992   – Peyo, Belgian cartoonist, created The Smurfs (b. 1928)
1993 – Norman Vincent Peale, American minister and author (b. 1898)
1994 – John Boswell, American historian, author, and academic (b. 1947)
  1994   – Rossano Brazzi, Italian actor (b. 1916)
1997 – James Komack, American actor, director, producer, and screenwriter (b. 1930)
  1997   – Toshiro Mifune, Chinese-Japanese actor and producer (b. 1920)
  1997   – Pierre Péladeau, Canadian businessman, founded Quebecor (b. 1925)
1998 – Syl Apps, Canadian ice hockey player and pole vaulter (b. 1915)
1999 – Bill Bowerman, American runner, coach, and businessman, co-founded Nike, Inc. (b. 1911)
  1999   – Maurice Couve de Murville, French soldier and politician, 152nd Prime Minister of France (b. 1907)
  1999   – João Figueiredo, Brazilian general and politician, 30th President of Brazil (b. 1918)
  1999   – William C. Schneider, American aerospace engineer (b. 1923)
2000 – John Cooper, English businessman, co-founded the Cooper Car Company (b. 1923)
2002 – Kjell Aukrust, Norwegian author and poet (b. 1920)
  2002   – Jake Thackray, English singer-songwriter and guitarist (b. 1938)
2004 – Johnny Oates, American baseball player, coach, and manager (b. 1946)
2006 – Braguinha, Brazilian singer-songwriter and producer (b. 1907)
  2006   – Kenneth Sivertsen, Norwegian guitarist and composer (b. 1961)
  2006   – Frank Stanton, American businessman (b. 1908)
2007 – Nicholas Pumfrey, English lawyer and judge (b. 1951)
  2007   – George Warrington, American businessman (b. 1952)
2008 – Ralph Harris, British journalist (b. 1921)
  2008   – Harold Pinter, English playwright, screenwriter, director, Nobel Prize laureate (b. 1930)
2009 – Marcus Bakker, Dutch journalist and politician (b. 1923)
  2009   – Rafael Caldera,  Venezuelan lawyer and politician, 65th President of Venezuela (b. 1916)
  2009   – George Michael, American sportscaster (b. 1939)
  2009   – Gero von Wilpert, German author and academic (b. 1933)
2010 – Elisabeth Beresford, English journalist and author (b. 1926)
  2010   – Frans de Munck, Dutch footballer and manager (b. 1922)
  2010   – Orestes Quércia, Brazilian journalist, lawyer, and politician, 28th Governor of São Paulo State (b. 1938)
  2010   – Eino Tamberg, Estonian composer and educator (b. 1930)
2011 – Johannes Heesters, Dutch-German entertainer (b. 1903)
2012 – Richard Rodney Bennett, English-American composer and academic (b. 1936)
  2012   – Charles Durning, American soldier and actor (b. 1923)
  2012   – Jack Klugman, American actor (b. 1922)
  2012   – Dennis O'Driscoll, Irish poet and critic (b. 1954)
2013 – Frédéric Back, German-Canadian director, animator, and screenwriter (b. 1924)
  2013   – Ian Barbour, Chinese-American author and scholar (b. 1923)
  2013   – John M. Goldman, English haematologist and oncologist (b. 1938)
  2013   – Allan McKeown, English-American screenwriter and producer (b. 1946)
2014 – Buddy DeFranco, American clarinet player (b. 1923)
  2014   – Edward Greenspan, Canadian lawyer and author (b. 1944)
  2014   – Herbert Harris, American lawyer and politician (b. 1926)
  2014   – Krzysztof Krauze, Polish director and screenwriter (b. 1953)
2015 – Turid Birkeland, Norwegian businesswoman and politician, Norwegian Minister of Culture (b. 1962)
  2015   – Letty Jimenez Magsanoc, Filipino journalist (b. 1941)
  2015   – Adriana Olguín, Chilean lawyer and politician, Chilean Minister of Justice (b. 1911)
2016 – Rick Parfitt, British musician (b. 1948)
  2016   – Liz Smith, English actress (b. 1921)
  2016   – Richard Adams, English author (b. 1920)
  2016   – Ben Xi, Chinese singer (b.1994)
2017 – Jerry Kindall, American baseball player and coach (b. 1935)
  2017   – Heather Menzies, Canadian-American model and actress (b. 1949)
2018 – Martha Érika Alonso, first female Governor of Puebla, Mexico, and her husband Rafael Moreno Valle Rosas, former governor; helicopter crash (Alonso b. 1973, Valle b. 1968)

Holidays and observances
 Christian feast day:
 Adela and Irmina
 Paola Elisabetta Cerioli
 Adam and Eve
 December 24 (Eastern Orthodox liturgics)
 Christmas Eve (Christianity) and its related observances:
 Aðfangadagskvöld, the day when the 13th and the last Yule Lad arrives to towns. (Iceland)
 Feast of the Seven Fishes (Italian Americans)
 Juleaften (Denmark)/Julaften (Norway)/Julafton (Sweden)
 Nittel Nacht (certain Orthodox Jewish denominations)
 Nochebuena (Spain and Spanish-speaking countries)
 The Declaration of Christmas Peace (Old Great Square of Turku, Finland's official Christmas City)
 Wigilia (Poland)
 Quviasukvik, the Inuit new year (Alaska, Canada, Greenland and Russia)
 Kūčios (Lithuania)
 Independence Day (Libya)
 Day of Military Honour – Siege of Ismail (Russia)

References

External links

 BBC: On This Day
 
 Historical Events on December 24

Days of the year
December